WGMR may refer to:

 WGMR (FM), a radio station (91.3 FM) licensed to serve Effingham, Illinois, United States
 WFGE, a radio station (101.1 FM) licensed to serve Tyrone, Pennsylvania, United States, which held the call sign WGMR from 1961 to 2008